Nicholas Payton (born September 26, 1973) is an American trumpet player and multi-instrumentalist. A Grammy Award winner, he is from New Orleans, Louisiana. He is also a prolific and provocative writer who comments on a multitude of subjects, including music, race, politics, and life in America.

Biography
The son of bassist and sousaphonist Walter Payton, he began playing the trumpet at the age of four and by age nine was sitting in with the Young Tuxedo Brass Band alongside his father. He began his professional career at ten years old as a member of James Andrews' All-Star Brass and was given his first steady gig by guitarist Danny Barker at The Famous Door on Bourbon Street. He enrolled at the New Orleans Center for Creative Arts and then at the University of New Orleans.

After touring with Marcus Roberts and Elvin Jones in the early 1990s, Payton signed a contract with Verve Records; his first album, From This Moment, appeared in 1995. In 1996 he performed on the soundtrack of the movie Kansas City, and in 1997 received a Grammy Award (Best Instrumental Solo) for his playing on the album Doc Cheatham & Nicholas Payton.

After seven albums on Verve, Payton signed with Warner Bros. Records, releasing Sonic Trance, his first album on the new label, in 2003. Besides his recordings under his own name, other significant collaborations include Trey Anastasio, Ray Brown, Ray Charles, Daniel Lanois, Dr. John, Stanley Jordan, Herbie Hancock, Roy Haynes, Zigaboo Modeliste, Marcus Roberts, Jill Scott, Clark Terry, Allen Toussaint, Nancy Wilson, Dr. Michael White, and Joe Henderson.

In 2004, he became a founding member of the SFJAZZ Collective. In 2008, he joined The Blue Note 7, a septet formed in honor of the 70th anniversary of Blue Note Records. In 2011, he formed a 21-piece big band ensemble called the Television Studio Orchestra. In 2011, he also recorded and released Bitches, a love narrative on which he played every instrument, sang, and wrote all of the music. In 2012 the Czech National Symphony Orchestra commissioned and debuted his first full orchestral work, The Black American Symphony. And in 2013, he formed his own record label, BMF Records, and the same year released two albums, #BAM Live at Bohemian Caverns, where he plays both trumpet and Fender Rhodes, often at once, and Sketches of Spain, which he recorded with the Basel Symphony Orchestra in Switzerland.

Payton's writings are provocative. One of his pieces, "On Why Jazz isn't Cool Anymore" describes the effects of cultural colonization on music. The article quickly earned his website 150,000 page views and sparked international press attention and debate.

Discography

As leader/co-leader 
 From This Moment (Verve, 1995) – recorded in 1994
 Gumbo Nouveau (Verve, 1996)
 Fingerpainting: The Music of Herbie Hancock with Christian McBride, Mark Whitfield (Verve, 1997) – music of Herbie Hancock
 Doc Cheatham & Nicholas Payton with Doc Cheatham (Verve, 1997) – Grammy won track included
 Payton's Place (Verve, 1998)
 Nick@Night (Verve, 1999)
 Dear Louis (Verve, 2001) – recorded in 2000
 Sonic Trance (Warner Bros., 2003)
 Mysterious Shorter with Bob Belden, Sam Yahel, John Hart, Billy Drummond (Chesky, 2006)
 Into the Blue (Nonesuch, 2008) – recorded in 2007
 Bitches (In+Out, 2011)
 Live at 2012 New Orleans Jazz & Heritage Festival (Munck Mix, 2012) – live at New Orleans Jazz & Heritage Festival
 #BAM: Live at Bohemian Caverns (BMF, >2013) – live at "Bohemian Caverns"
 Sketches of Spain with Sinfonieorchester Basel (BMF, 2013)
 Numbers (Paytone, 2014)
 Letters (Paytone, 2015)[2CD]
 The Egyptian Second Line (Paytone, 2016)
 Afro-Caribbean Mixtape (Paytone, 2017)[2CD] – recorded in 2016
 Relaxin' with Nick (Smoke Sessions, 2019)[2CD] – live at "Smoke"
 Quarantined with Nick (Paytone, 2020)
 Maestro Rhythm King (Paytone, 2020)[limited edition LP]
 Smoke Sessions (Smoke Sessions, 2021)
 New Standards, Vol. 1 with Terri Lyne Carrington, Kris Davis, Linda May Han Oh, Matthew Stevens (Candid, 2022)

As group 
New Orleans Collective
With Wessell Anderson, Christopher Thomas, Peter Martin and Brian Blade
 New Orleans Collective (Paddle Wheel, 1993)

SFJAZZ Collective (2004-06)
 SFJazz Collective (Nonesuch, 2005) – recorded in 2004
 SFJazz Collective 2 (Nonesuch, 2006) – recorded in 2005

The Blue Note 7 (2008-09)
 Mosaic: A Celebration of Blue Note Records (Blue Note, 2009) – recorded in 2008

As sideman/guest 
With Eric Alexander
Summit Meeting (Milestone, 2002) – recorded in 2001

With Joanne Brackeen
 Pink Elephant Magic (Arkadia Jazz, 1999) – recorded in 1998

With Bill Charlap
 Plays George Gershwin: The American Soul (Blue Note, 2005)

With Common
 Electric Circus (MCA, 2002)

With The Headhunters
 Evolution Revolution (Basin Street, 2003)

With Joe Henderson
 Big Band (Verve, 1997) – recorded in 1992-96

With Doc Houlind
 New Orleans Sessions (Music Mecca, 1995)

With Dr. John
 N'Awlinz: Dis Dat or d'Udda (Blue Note, 2004)

With Elvin Jones
 Youngblood (Enja, 1992)
 Going Home (Enja, 1993) – recorded in 1992
 It Don't Mean a Thing (Enja, 1993)

With 
 Touch the World (Newborder Recordings. 2020) – in track ""

With Jimmy Smith
 Damn! (Verve, 1995)
 Angel Eyes: Ballads & Slow Jams (Verve, 1996) – recorded in 1995

With Allen Toussaint
 The Bright Mississippi (Nonesuch, 2009) – recorded in 2008

Awards and nominations

References

External links

The Complete Nicholas Payton: #BAM, Bird, Barack Obama, more
Biography from JazzTrumpetSolos.com
Interview with Nicholas Payton for jazzInternet.com
"In Conversation with Nicholas Payton" by Ted Panken, (Jazz.com)
Nicholas Payton: Live At The Village Vanguard – slideshow by NPR
DTM interview

1973 births
Living people
American jazz trumpeters
American male trumpeters
Grammy Award winners
Jazz musicians from New Orleans
Verve Records artists
21st-century trumpeters
21st-century American male musicians
American male jazz musicians
Christian McBride Big Band members
The Blue Note 7 members
SFJAZZ Collective members
Smoke Sessions Records artists
Warner Records artists
Nonesuch Records artists